The Federal Investigation Agency, responsible for border control, criminal investigation, counter-intelligence and security of Pakistan, is headed by a Director General. It is a highly coveted post and is usually occupied by a Grade 22 officer of the Police Service of Pakistan. The Director General of the Federal Investigation Agency (DG FIA) reports directly to the Interior Secretary of Pakistan.

Director Generals (1974–Present)

References 

Federal Investigation Agency
Law enforcement in Pakistan

Current FIA DG is Mr.Mohsin. Butt who is appointed as a Director General on 22 July, 2022.